Agua de Oro is a locality located in the Colón Department in the Province of Córdoba in central Argentina. It is located on the eastern slopes of the Sierra Chica, 800 meters above sea level, crossed by the San Vicente River. The municipal radius extends for approximately 157 square km, including urban and rural areas.

References

Populated places in Córdoba Province, Argentina